The 2001 Asian Junior Athletics Championships was the ninth edition of the international athletics competition for Asian under-20 athletes, organised by the Asian Athletics Association. It took place from 19–22 July in Bandar Seri Begawan, Brunei. A total of 43 events were contested, which were divided equally between male and female athletes aside from the men's 3000 metres steeplechase.

Medal summary

Men

Women

2001 Medal Table

References

Results
Asian Junior Championships 2001. World Junior Athletics History. Retrieved on 2013-10-18.

External links
Asian Athletics official website

Asian Junior Championships
Asian Junior Athletics Championships
Athletics in Brunei
Bandar Seri Begawan
Asian Junior Athletics Championships
2001 in Asian sport
2001 in youth sport